Events in the year 2003 in Monaco.

Incumbents 
 Monarch: Rainier III
 State Minister: Patrick Leclercq

Events 

 26 May – Ralf Schumacher won the 2003 Monaco Grand Prix.

Deaths

See also 

 2003 in Europe
 City states

References 

 
Years of the 21st century in Monaco
2000s in Monaco
Monaco
Monaco